Romanova is a rural locality (a village) in Stepanovskoye Rural Settlement, Kudymkarsky District, Perm Krai, Russia. The population was 52 as of 2010. There are 9 streets.

Geography 
Romanova is located 4 km northwest of Kudymkar (the district's administrative centre) by road. Kudymkar is the nearest rural locality.

References 

Rural localities in Kudymkarsky District